Kappel, Käppel or Kaeppel may refer to:

Places

Switzerland
 Kappel, Switzerland, in the canton of Solothurn
 Kappel am Albis, in the canton of Zurich
 Wars of Kappel, 16th century conflicts
 Ebnat-Kappel, in the canton of St. Gallen

Germany
 Kappel, Rhineland-Palatinate
 Kappel-Grafenhausen, in Baden-Württemberg
 Kappel, Lenzkirch, in Baden-Württemberg
 the Danish name for Kappeln, in Schleswig-Holstein

Other countries
Kappel am Krappfeld, Austria

People
 Barbara Kappel (born 1965), Austrian politician
 Carl Henry Kaeppel (1887–1946), Australian classicist
 Frederick Kappel (1902–1994), American businessman
 Gertrud Kappel, (1884–1971), German soprano
 Heinie Kappel (1863–1905), American baseball player
 Hubert Käppel (born 1951), German classical guitarist
 Hugh Kappel (1910–1982), American artist
 Joe Kappel (1857–1929), American baseball player 
 Leandro Kappel (born 1989), Dutch footballer
 Niko Kappel (born 1995), German paralympic athlete
 Rudi Kappel (1926–1959), Surinamese pilot
 Vladimir Kappel (1883-1920), Russian general

See also
 Kapell, a surname